University Art Museum may refer to:

University art museums and galleries
University Art Museum at University at Albany at the University at Albany, State University of New York
University Art Museum, Santa Barbara
University Art Museum, CSULB at California State University, Long Beach
Paul and Lulu Hilliard University Art Museum
Princeton University Art Museum
Indiana University Art Museum
Arizona State University Art Museum
Miami University Art Museum
University of New Mexico Art Museum